It's Such a Pretty World Today is a studio album by American country artist Wynn Stewart. It was released in April 1967 via Capitol Records and was produced by Ken Nelson. It was Stewart's second studio release in his recording career and contained 12 tracks. The album's name was derived from its title track, which became a number one hit in 1967. Although not written by Stewart, other songs on the album were self-composed and contained new material that was previously unreleased. The album reached charting positions on the Billboard surveys as well.

Background and content
The album was Stewart's second for the Capitol label. Stewart had previously recorded for Challenge Records, where he had three charting records including the major hit, "Wishful Thinking." However, after opening a nightclub, which eventually closed, he left Challenge and signed with Capitol. He had been recording for Capitol for two years when It's Such a Pretty World Today was cut in the studio.

The material recorded for the album was cut between 1965 and 1967 at the Capitol Recording Studio, located in Hollywood, California. The sessions were produced by Ken Nelson. Altogether, the project consisted of 12 tracks, six of which were self-written by Stewart himself. Among these songs was the single "Cause I Have You," as well as "Out There Is the World," "You Told Him" and "Unfaithful Arms." Also included was songs composed by others. Among these is "I Keep Forgettin' That I Forgot About You," which was composed by singer-songwriter Liz Anderson. "Let's Pretend We're Kids" was composed by Bobby Wayne.

Release and reception
Before the release of It's Such a Pretty World Today, three singles were issued between 1965 and 1967. The first was "I Keep Forgettin' That I Forgot About You," which was released in August 1965. The single spent seven weeks on the Billboard Hot Country Singles chart before only reaching number 43 in November 1967. A second single was issued in February 1966, the track "Angels Don't Die." However, the song failed to chart any Billboard publications. The lack of initial single success potentially caused the album's delay in release. However, in January 1967, the title track of the album was issued as a radio single. Spending 22 weeks on the Billboard Hot Country Singles chart, it peaked at number one in June 1967. The song was Stewart's biggest hit and only number one single in his recording career.

After the title track's success, It's Such a Pretty World Today was released in April 1967. It was issued as a vinyl LP, containing six songs on each side of the record. The album was also successful on the Billboard charts, spending 25 weeks on the Top Country Albums survey before also reaching number one in August 1967. The record was also his only number one Billboard album. It was also his only album to chart on the Billboard 200 record list. Spending eight weeks charting, it reached a peak of number 158 in September 1967. Upon its release, the album received reception Billboard magazine's July issue. It was listed as one of their "New Action Breakout" LP's for its success on their chart publications that year. One final single was spawned following the release of the album and after the title track's success. "Cause I Have You" was issued as a single in June 1967. The song spent 16 weeks on the Billboard country songs chart before reaching number nine in September. "Cause I Have You" became Stewart's third top ten hit as an artist.

Track listing

Personnel
All credits are adapted from the liner notes of It's Such a Pretty World Today.

Musical personnel
 David Allen – drums
 Bobby Austin – bass
 Buddy Cagle – guitar
 Jimmy Collins – steel guitar
 Eddie Drake – guitar
 George French – piano
 Dennis Hromek – bass
 The Anita Kerr Singers – background vocals
 Ralph Mooney – steel guitar
 Roy Nichols – guitar
 Bob Pierce – piano
 Helen Price – drums
 Roy Staggs – guitar
 Wynn Stewart – lead vocals
 Bobby Wayne – guitar
 Red Wooten – bass

Technical personnel
 Ken Nelson – producer
 Ken Veeder – cover photo

Chart performance

Release history

References

1967 albums
Albums produced by Ken Nelson (United States record producer)
Capitol Records albums
Wynn Stewart albums

Albums recorded at Capitol Studios